Kelly Richmond Pope is a forensic accountant, professor at DePaul University and filmmaker who analyzes corporate crime. Her documentary on whistleblowers, “All the Queen’s Horses” won the HBO Spotlight Award for Best Documentary at its World Premiere in 2017 and the Golden Laurels Award at the 2018 Beloit International Film Festival.

References 

Year of birth missing (living people)
Living people
American criminologists
American women criminologists
American accountants
Women accountants
American filmmakers
American women film directors